Chile competed at the 2018 Winter Olympics in Pyeongchang, South Korea, from 9 to 25 February 2018. The Chilean delegation consisted of seven athletes, five of which were returning from the 2014 Winter Olympics. The three male and four female delegation competed in three sports.

Competitors
The following is the list of number of competitors participating in the Chilean delegation per sport.

Alpine skiing 

Chile qualified three athletes, one male and one female. Later it received a reallocated unused quota spot.

Cross-country skiing 

Chile qualified two athletes, one male and one female. 

Distance

Freestyle skiing 

Chile qualified one female athlete in slopestyle, and received a reallocation spot in women's ski cross.

Ski cross

Slopestyle

See also
Chile at the 2018 Summer Youth Olympics

References

Nations at the 2018 Winter Olympics
2018
2018 in Chilean sport